Wilhelmsdorf is a village in the district of Neustadt (Aisch)-Bad Windsheim in Bavaria in Germany.

Wilhelmsdorf was established by Huguenots. The village was named after the sovereign ruler George William, Margrave of Brandenburg-Bayreuth, who refuged them. The Huguenot tradition is still a part of the village history. Sermons in the local Lutheran church were held in French until around 1900.

In the 19th century Wilhelmsdorf was well known for their stocking-weavers. In 1903 the first compass factory was established. In the 20th century several competing compass factories were located at Wilhelmsdorf. Now Wilhelmsdorf has a compass museum.

Wilhelmsdorf should not be mistaken for Wilhermsdorf, a village 15 km away.

Boroughs
Wilhelmsdorf
Ebersbach
Oberalbach
Stadelhof
Trabelshof
Unteralbachermühle

Politics

Municipal council

The municipal council has 12 members:
CSU 7 seats

FWG 3 seats
UWG 2 seats

(last municipal election on 3 March 2002)

References

External links
 Compass museum Wilhelmsdorf

Neustadt (Aisch)-Bad Windsheim